Sainik School, Ghorakhal is a Sainik School  established by first Prime Minister of India, Jawaharlal Nehru in 1966.

History
Sainik School, Ghorakhal was established on 21 March 1966. The school was built on the 500 Acre Ghorakhal Estate of the then Nawab of Rampur, near Bhowali in Nainital District. It was one of the first Sainik Schools to be built. The school started with 60 students in 1966.

Campus
The school is located 4 km from Bhowali and 7 km from Bhimtal. The major landmark is the temple of Golu Devta.
With its large tea gardens and soul soothing beauty it is the perfect place for the positive upbringing of a child. The entry gate of the campus shows a brief glimpse of all the three wings of the Indian Armed Forces with miniature models of tanks, aircraft and marine ships.

Houses 
All students are assigned to their respective "Houses". In total, there are 9 houses, the Shiwalik, Kesari, Kumaon and Singh are the senior houses while Dhruv, Luv, Kush, Abhimanyu and Bharat are the junior Houses.

References

External links

 Official website

Sainik schools
Boys' schools in India
High schools and secondary schools in Uttarakhand
Boarding schools in Uttarakhand
Education in Nainital district
Educational institutions established in 1966
1966 establishments in Uttar Pradesh